Frank Arthur Philbrook (9 November 1931  30 October 2017) was a Liberal party member of the House of Commons of Canada. He graduated from the University of Toronto as MD in 1958, and was a member of the College of Family Physicians of Canada. He retired from medical practice in 1993.

Philbrook was born in Toronto, Ontario. Before entering politics, he spent two years at a mission hospital in Kashmir and then four years as Medical Officer on a World Bank project in Pakistan. Upon returning to Canada, he became director of clinical research at Ortho-Pharmaceuticals Canada Ltd, before returning to private practice in 1973.

He was first elected at the Halton riding in
the 1974 general election and served in the 30th Canadian Parliament, but was defeated in the 1979 federal election by Otto Jelinek of the Progressive Conservative party.

Electoral record

Halton

References

External links
 

1931 births
Canadian general practitioners
Liberal Party of Canada MPs
2017 deaths
Members of the House of Commons of Canada from Ontario
Politicians from Toronto